Nerkin Sasnashen is a village in the Talin Municipality of the Aragatsotn Province of Armenia. It is home to the ruins of a 7th-century Armenian monastery. The village contains a granite memorial marking the crash site of a United States Air Force C-130 shot down by Soviet MiG-17s on 2 September 1958 with the loss of 17 U.S. personnel.

References

Report of the results of the 2001 Armenian Census

Populated places in Aragatsotn Province